Haplogroup L4 is a human mitochondrial DNA (mtDNA) haplogroup. It is a small maternal clade primarily restricted to Africa.
 

L4 is important in East Africa. The highest frequencies are in Tanzania among the Hadza at 60-83% and Sandawe at 48%.

It has two branches, L4a and L4b. Subgroup L4a was formerly called L7 and considered a separate subclade of L3'4'7. It has  been recognized as a subclade of L4, with L3 as its outgroup by Behar et al. (2008).
The parent clade L3'4 is to have emerged at 106–66 kya.  
L4 is not much later than this, estimated at 87 kya by Fernandes et al. (2015).

Phylogeny
The following phylogeny is based on van Oven and Kayser (2008).  

L3'4
L4
 L4a  (formerly known as  L7), mutations: 195C, 3357, 5460, 10373, 11253, 11344, 11485, 12414, 13174, 14302, 16260.
L4a1
L4a1a
L4a2
L4b, mutations: 709, 3918.
L4b1
L4b2  (formerly known as L3g or L4g)
L4b2a
L4b2a1
L4b2a2
L4b2a2a
L4b2a2b
L4b2b

References

External links 

Ian Logan's Mitochondrial DNA Site
Mannis van Oven's Phylotree

L4